Business & Society is a peer-reviewed academic journal that covers the field of business. The journal's editors-in-chief are Andrew Crane (University of Bath), Irene Henriques (York University), Bryan Husted (Tecnológico de Monterrey), and Frank de Bakker (IÉSEG School of Management). It was established in 1960 and is published by SAGE Publications in association with International Association for Business and Society.

Abstracting and indexing
The journal is abstracted and indexed in Scopus and the Social Sciences Citation Index. According to the Journal Citation Reports, its 2020 impact factor is 7.792.

References

External links

SAGE Publishing academic journals
English-language journals